The United Belgian States ( or ;), also known as the United States of Belgium, was a short-lived confederal republic in the Southern Netherlands (modern-day Belgium) which was established after the Brabant Revolution. It existed from January to December 1790 as part of the unsuccessful revolt against the Habsburg Emperor, Joseph II.

Background

Influenced by the Enlightenment, Emperor Joseph II, who became sole ruler of the Habsburg lands after Maria Theresa's death in 1780, decreed a series of large-scale reforms in the Austrian Netherlands designed to radically modernize and centralize the political, judicial and administrative systems.

Characteristically, Joseph II abruptly imposed his reforms without even a semblance of consultation with the population, which actually included an influential urban intelligentsia and other segments of the ruling classes who were highly receptive to such innovations. The Emperor's edict of tolerance of 1781 established religious freedom. Another edict in 1784 removed from the Catholic clergy responsibility for the civil registry, and civil marriage was introduced. Under the Edict on Idle Institutions (1780), contemplative religious orders, deemed useless, were dissolved and diocesan seminaries were abolished and replaced by general seminaries in Leuven and Luxembourg. Feudal and trade corporation regulations and jurisdictions were modified or abolished, and the authorities abolished the ancient provinces of Flanders, Brabant, Hainaut, Namur, and Luxembourg, replacing them with 9 circles, subdivided in 64 districts. Seigneurial jurisdictions and rights, including the corvée, were abolished. As in Hungary, Joseph II attempted to introduce German as the language of administration for the sake of efficiency.

Politics
The United Belgian States was a confederal republic of eight provinces which had their own governments, were sovereign and independent, and were governed directly by the Sovereign Congress, the confederal government. The Sovereign Congress was seated in Brussels and consisted of representatives of each of the eight provinces. Henri Van der Noot served in the capacity of Prime Minister, retaining the title of minister plenipotentiary having previously held the title of minister plenipotentiary of Brabant.

Brabant Revolution

In 1789, a church-inspired popular revolt broke out in reaction to the emperor's centralizing and anticlerical policies. Two factions appeared: the Statists who opposed the reforms, and the Vonckists named for Jan Frans Vonck who initially supported the reforms but then joined the opposition, due to the clumsy way in which the reforms were carried out.

The uprising started in Brabant, which in January 1789 declared that it no longer recognized the emperor's rule. The leader of the Statisten faction, Henri Van der Noot, crossed the border into the Dutch Republic and raised a small army in Breda in Staats-Brabant, the northern (Dutch Republic) part of Brabant.

In October, he invaded Brabant and captured Turnhout, defeating the Austrians in the Battle of Turnhout on 27 October. Ghent was taken on 13 November, and on 17 November the governors Albert Casimir and Maria Christina fled Brussels. The remains of the imperial forces withdrew behind the citadel walls of Luxembourg and Antwerp.

Van der Noot now declared Brabant independent, and all the other provinces of the Austrian Netherlands (except Luxembourg) soon followed suit. On 11 January 1790 they signed a pact, establishing a confederation under the name Verenigde Nederlandse Staten / États-Belgiques-Unis (United Belgian States) and a governing body known as the Sovereign Congress. The Dutch Act of Abjuration in 1581 and the American Declaration of Independence in 1776 served as models for the Declaration of Independence of Flanders and some of the other provinces between November 1789 and early 1790. Shortly afterwards, the Articles of Confederation served as a model for the Treaty of the United Belgian States of 11 January 1790.

Independently, in 1789, a revolution had broken out in Liège. The revolutionaries established a republic which joined the United Belgian States in a semblance of an alliance.

Realizing the fragility of the new state, Van der Noot approached foreign states for support and suggested a unification with the Dutch Republic, with little success. Furthermore, the Statist and Vonckist factions were in constant conflict, bordering on civil war.

Suppression of the Revolt
On 27 February 1790 Joseph II died and his brother Leopold II succeeded him as emperor. Leopold II quickly moved to recapture the Austrian Netherlands. On 24 October 1790 imperial troops took the city of Namur, forcing the province of Namur to recognize the authority of the emperor. Two days later, the province of West Flanders followed suit, and by December the entire territory was again in imperial hands.

The Austrian restoration and hegemony was historically brief however, as the region was overrun by French armies in 1794 during the French Revolutionary Wars, and was annexed by France on 1 October 1795.

Legacy
Though short-lived, the United Belgian States had long-lasting repercussions. It had given the Southern Netherlands their first taste of independence, and had sparked a new political idea: the state of Belgium. In 1830, the inhabitants of the Southern Netherlands successfully revolted against the Netherlands during the Belgian Revolution, creating the modern state of Belgium.

See also
 Republic of Liège
 Brabant Revolution

References

Works cited

External links
 Text of the Treaty of Union 
 Text of the Treaty of Union 

 
United Belgian States
States and territories established in 1790
1790 disestablishments in Europe
1790 establishments in Europe
Former confederations
1790 in the Habsburg monarchy